Harley H. McAdams (born 1938, Liberty, Texas) is an American physicist, microbial geneticist, and developmental biologist. McAdams and his collaborators have published foundational insights on the nature of genetic regulatory logic and cell biology, the molecular basis for inevitable random variation levels of protein production between different cells, and genetic logic circuits that control the bacterial cell cycle. McAdams is married to Lucy Shapiro. They were jointly awarded the 2009 John Scott Medal for “bringing the methods of electrical circuit analysis to the description of genetic networks of the simple bacterium Caulobacter.”

McAdams, a professor emeritus in the Department of Developmental Biology in the Stanford University School of Medicine, holds undergraduate and graduate degrees in physics from Texas A&M University (BS), the University of Illinois (Urbana) (MS), and Rice University (MA, PhD). He is a fellow of the American Society for Microbiology.

References 

Living people
21st-century American biologists
Rice University alumni
1938 births
20th-century American biologists
Stanford University Department of Biology faculty
Grainger College of Engineering alumni
Developmental biologists
Scientists from Texas
People from Liberty, Texas
American geneticists
American microbiologists
21st-century American physicists
20th-century American physicists